The 1982 Campeonato Ecuatoriano de Fútbol de la Serie A was the 24th national championship for football teams in Ecuador.

Teams
The number of teams for this season was played by 12 teams. Aucas and Deportivo Quevedo promoted as winners of First Stage of Serie B.

First stage

Second stage

Liguilla Final

Tiebreaker

References

External links
 Línea de Tiempo de eventos y partidos de Liga Deportiva Universitaria
 Calendario de partidos históricos de Liga Deportiva Universitaria
 Sistema de Consulta Interactiva y Herramienta de consulta interactiva de partidos de Liga Deportiva Universitaria

1982
Ecu